The 2020 Americas Rugby League Championship is a planned rugby league tournament scheduled to be held in Kingston, Jamaica in November 2020. This tournament will be the 4th Americas Rugby League Championship. On 12 June 2020 it was announced that the tournament was postponed due to the COVID-19 pandemic. It was provisionally rescheduled for May 2021 to be played alongside the America 9s (Rugby league nines) competition hosted by the USA. As the venue will change the Jamaica Rugby League Association has been offered first option on hosting the 2022 Americas Championship.  In April 2021 it was announced that the championship was abandoned with the 2022 tournament being the next playing.

References 

Americas Rugby League Championship
Americas
Americas Rugby League Championship
Americas Rugby League Championship